Christoph Sauser (born 13 April 1976 in Sigriswil, Switzerland)  is a cross-country mountain biker who won the bronze medal at the 2000 Summer Olympics in Sydney, Australia.  He currently races on the Specialized Cross Country Team.

He was the overall winner of the UCI World Cup in 2004 and 2005, along with taking 2nd in 2002 and 2003, with a 3rd place in 2001. He has won a total of 10 World Cups.

In 2006 Sauser won his first Absa Cape Epic with partner Silvio Bundi. He then partnered up with Burry Stander winning back to back in 2011 and 2012. Sauser partnered up with Jaroslav Kulhavý in  2013, once again claiming 1st in the marathon stage race.  At the 2015 Absa Cape Epic Sauser rode himself in the race’s history books by becoming the first person to win it a landmark five times, after which he retired from professional racing. In March 2017 Sauser came out of retirement in a bid to win his sixth Absa Cape Epic. In spite of being in good form he and partner Jaroslav Kulhavý (Investec Songo Specialized) finished second to Nino Schurter and Matthias Stirnemann (Scott-Sram). The Sauser/Kulhavy combination was hampered by  punctures at critical times.

He won first place in the 2008 Mountain Bike World Championships, came second in the 2005 edition, and third in 2001. He has been Swiss champion four times. In his early years of racing he started in both XC and DH races. He is one of the top mountain bikers in the last few years.

Major results
2014
 1st  Marathon, UEC European Championships

References

External links
Official Website

1976 births
Living people
Swiss male cyclists
Cross-country mountain bikers
Olympic cyclists of Switzerland
Cyclists at the 2000 Summer Olympics
Cyclists at the 2004 Summer Olympics
Cyclists at the 2008 Summer Olympics
Olympic bronze medalists for Switzerland
Olympic medalists in cycling
People from Thun District
UCI Mountain Bike World Champions (men)
Medalists at the 2000 Summer Olympics
Cape Epic winners
Swiss mountain bikers
Sportspeople from the canton of Bern